Holger Häffner is a German slalom canoeist who competed in the late 1990s. He won a bronze medal in the K-1 team event at the 1997 ICF Canoe Slalom World Championships in Três Coroas.

References

German male canoeists
Living people
Year of birth missing (living people)
Medalists at the ICF Canoe Slalom World Championships